Eriochiton is a genus of small shrub in the family Chenopodiaceae (sensu stricto), which are included in Amaranthaceae (sensu lato) according to the APG classification. Species are endemic to Australia.

Description
Species have woolly branches. The leaves are linear, silky-woolly. Flowers are solitary in the axils, the perianth is 5-lobed. Fruiting perianth hardened, silky-woolly, with 5 spines and 5 erect wings arising from the base of the lobes. Seeds horizontal.

Species
Species include:

Eriochiton sclerolaenoides  (F. Muell.) F.Muell. ex  A.J. Scott

References

External links

Amaranthaceae
Amaranthaceae genera
Caryophyllales of Australia